Moon Shot: The Inside Story of America's Race to the Moon is a 1994 book written by  Mercury Seven astronaut Alan Shepard, with NBC News correspondent Jay Barbree and Associated Press space writer Howard Benedict. Astronaut Donald K. "Deke" Slayton is also listed as an author, although he died before the project was completed and was an author in name only, and astronaut Neil Armstrong wrote the introduction.

Miniseries
The book was turned into a four part television documentary miniseries that aired on TBS in the United States in 1994. The miniseries was narrated by Barry Corbin (as Slayton) and featured interviews with several American astronauts as well as a few Russian cosmonauts. Slayton died before the miniseries completed production in 1993 and the miniseries is dedicated to his memory.

References

External links

Apollo Lunar Surface Journal Chaikin comments on faked book photo
James Scotti comments on Moon Shot
Apollo Lunar Surface Journal

American non-fiction books
1994 non-fiction books
1990s American television miniseries
Peabody Award-winning television programs
Apollo program
Neil Armstrong
Alan Shepard
Books by astronauts